Sudsy Malone's Rock 'n Roll Laundry & Bar was a music venue in the Corryville neighborhood of Cincinnati, Ohio, across the street from Bogart's near the University of Cincinnati. John Cioffi was the owner. Cioffi opened other clubs including Sudsys in Lexington. The site often showcased many indie music and punk music bands. As the name suggests, the bar also housed a laundromat. The site had difficulty staying in business over the years, closing and reopening its doors several times, finally closing for good in 2008.

In addition to the nightly shows by local and regional acts, many more established musicians and bands played the site, including Beck, Afghan Whigs, Guided By Voices, The White Stripes, Smashing Pumpkins, Morphine, Wesley Willis, Ass Ponys, Sleater-Kinney, Neutral Milk Hotel, Modest Mouse, Over the Rhine, Rigor Mortis, Betty Blowtorch, Vains of Jenna, and many other up-and-coming bands of the punk/grunge/alternative music scene of the late 1980s and 1990s.

In the fall of 2020, the former Sudsy's was demolished.

References

Further reading
 Albert Pyle, "Saturday at Sudsy Malone's: A Lot of Noise, A Jug of Tide and Thou," Cincinnati Magazine, August 1987, pp. 40–41.
 Steven Rosen, "Sudsy Malone's: The Leader of the Laundromats," Cincinnati Enquirer, Sept. 28, 1986, pp. 28, 30.
 
 Andrew Risch, "Cincinnati’s Rock ‘n Roll Laundromat: Sudsy Malone’s CincyMusic,

Defunct companies based in Cincinnati
Former laundry buildings
Music venues in Cincinnati
Nightclubs in the United States